"Funeral Song (The Resurrection)" (originally simple "Funeral Song") is a power ballad by Finnish rock band The Rasmus, originally released on the band's fifth album Dead Letters on 21 March 2003. It was a number-two hit on the Finnish singles chart.

The single was released on 25 April 2004 by the record label Playground Music Scandinavia. It was the fourth single from the album Dead Letters and features the B-side, "If You Ever". The maxi single also includes "Everything You Say".

Track listing
CD single
 "Funeral Song" – 3:21
 "If You Ever"

Maxi single
 "Funeral Song" – 3:21
 "If You Ever"
 "Everything You Say"

Music video
The music video for "Funeral Song" was directed by Niclas Fronda and Fredrik Löfberg, Baranga Film. It was shot on a dark, rainy street in Stockholm, Sweden.
Singer Lauri Ylönen is portrayed as an angel sent to take a girl's life after she has been fatally struck by a vehicle. A big scene builds up with police everywhere and a gathering crowd as Lauri slowly makes his way to the scene of the accident. Lauri opens out his coat and crows fly out; connoting death. Lauri then kneels down by the dying girl, strokes her face and takes her life.

This video won a prize on the MTV Europe Awards 2004 for best video and a silver award at the Muuvi-Gaala in 2005.

Band's comments
Lauri, the singer-songwriter, has said that the song was written about himself who has hurt many times in the past.

References

External links
 The Rasmus' official website
 Lyrics
 "Funeral Song" music video on YouTube
 Funeral Directors
 FRANKJBARONE FUNERAL HOME

The Rasmus songs
2004 singles
Songs written by Lauri Ylönen
2003 songs
Rock ballads